Elections to Armagh District Council were held on 19 May 1993 on the same day as the other Northern Irish local government elections. The election used four district electoral areas to elect a total of 22 councillors.

Election results

Note: "Votes" are the first preference votes.

Districts summary

|- class="unsortable" align="centre"
!rowspan=2 align="left"|Ward
! % 
!Cllrs
! % 
!Cllrs
! %
!Cllrs
! %
!Cllrs
! % 
!Cllrs
!rowspan=2|TotalCllrs
|- class="unsortable" align="center"
!colspan=2 bgcolor="" | UUP
!colspan=2 bgcolor="" | SDLP
!colspan=2 bgcolor="" | DUP
!colspan=2 bgcolor="" | Sinn Féin
!colspan=2 bgcolor="white"| Others
|-
|align="left"|Armagh City
|26.5
|2
|bgcolor="#99FF66"|46.7
|bgcolor="#99FF66"|3
|11.2
|0
|15.6
|1
|0.0
|0
|6
|-
|align="left"|Crossmore
|31.0
|1
|bgcolor="#99FF66"|59.7
|bgcolor="#99FF66"|4
|0.0
|0
|9.3
|0
|0.0
|0
|5
|-
|align="left"|Cusher
|bgcolor="40BFF5"|66.5
|bgcolor="40BFF5"|4
|15.8
|1
|14.3
|1
|3.4
|0
|0.0
|0
|6
|-
|align="left"|The Orchard
|bgcolor="40BFF5"|49.9
|bgcolor="40BFF5"|3
|24.1
|1
|20.1
|1
|5.9
|0
|0.0
|0
|5
|- class="unsortable" class="sortbottom" style="background:#C9C9C9"
|align="left"| Total
|44.5
|10
|35.6
|9
|11.5
|2
|8.4
|1
|0.0
|0
|22
|-
|}

Districts results

Armagh City

1989: 3 x SDLP, 2 x UUP, 1 x Sinn Féin
1993: 3 x SDLP, 2 x UUP, 1 x Sinn Féin
1989-1993 Change: No change

Crossmore

1989: 3 x SDLP, 2 x UUP
1993: 4 x SDLP, 1 x UUP
1993-1997 Change: SDLP gain from UUP

Cusher

1989: 4 x UUP, 1 x SDLP, 1 x DUP
1993: 4 x UUP, 1 x SDLP, 1 x DUP
1989-1993 Change: No change

The Orchard

1989: 3 x UUP, 1 x SDLP, 1 x DUP
1993: 3 x UUP, 1 x SDLP, 1 x DUP
1989-1993 Change: No change

References

1993 Northern Ireland local elections
19993 District Council election
1993
May 1993 events in the United Kingdom